Constitution Plaza is a large commercial mixed-use development in Downtown Hartford, Connecticut.

Construction
Constitution Plaza was built for $42 million and completed in stages from 1961 to 1964. 
Its planning and construction were spearheaded by a committee of local corporate leaders and business interests, beginning in the late 1950s.  
After running into financial turmoil in its early stages, the project was eventually taken-over and completed by Hartford-based Travelers Insurance Company.

It was the first substantial urban redevelopment project in Hartford and replaced a run-down, working class, ethnic neighborhood known as Front Street.  Subject to periodic flooding (before the construction of riverfront dikes and Interstate 91) and in serious physical decline, this neighborhood was nostalgically known for its large Italian-American population and its eclectic collection of local restaurants, businesses and shops.  The merit of its wholesale demolition to accommodate Constitution Plaza is still locally debated nearly six decades after it occurred.  (The name "Front Street" which so well-gilded through decades of its lamented demise, was resurrected as the official project name for a large mixed-use development to be built adjacent to the new Connecticut Convention Center complex, although this project has experienced numerous delays and has lost a number of sponsoring developer partners over the last several years.)

Locale
Situated at the eastern side of Hartford's downtown area, near Connecticut's landmark Old State House, this complex of office towers, commercial buildings, parking garages, and luxury apartments covers three city blocks, and is connected by a series of elevated pedestrian plazas and bridges.

Constitution Plaza is considered by some as a "great-but-unfinished planning idea", and by others as a fallacy of the broken promises of mid-century, American urban renewal.   

Set on a gently sloping site, the raised plaza originated from the idea of setting it at the elevation of Hartford's once-vibrant Main Street and its numerous, but now long-gone department stores that sat a block west. 
The Main Street shopping district was to be connected to Constitution Plaza by overhead pedestrian bridges, down along both Temple and Kinsley Streets across Market Street, but for various reasons they were never built. (Kinsley Street no longer exists, having been absorbed into the site for the "State House Square" office and mixed-use complex) 
A proposed arena and convention center was to be sited east of the Plaza across Columbus Boulevard and adjacent to I-91, but these facilities were also eliminated from the original plan and later moved a block west of Main Street in the mid 1970s, which became the original Hartford Civic Center and was rebuilt in the mid 2000s as today's XL Center.  

As a result, Constitution Plaza today sits several feet above the city's streetscape, disconnected and mostly devoid of pedestrian life except during workdays.  
This is also a primary reason that the plaza's original "retail court" was never successful.  However, as later office tower development occurred on adjacent blocks, in particular to the east and south, additional pedestrian bridges were built to connect them to the main Plaza level.  
Most successful was the culmination of a 25-year effort through the much-regarded Riverfront Recapture initiative.  Fulfilling a long-held planning goal, Constitution Plaza is now connected to the river's edge via a new (also elevated) pedestrian space that crosses over (a vastly reconfigured) Interstate 91 to a large waterfront amphitheater and walkways up-and-down river, and then across the Connecticut River to East Hartford.

Architecture

Constitution Plaza is a fine example of mid-twentieth-century commercial design, created as a series of projects under the overall coordination of Hartford architect Charles DuBose, which has sustained minimal alterations since it was designed. Its three largest office towers showcase various styles of glass-and-spandrel panel systems, with the glass surfaces recently replaced on both One and One Hundred Constitution Plaza with more reflective and energy-efficient systems. However, it's been noted these new window surfaces lack the character of the original dark glass and spandrel colors that gave the towers a sophisticated and more backdrop feel to the featured plaza and landscaping. 

Its major buildings are:
 One Constitution Plaza (Kahn & Jacobs, 1961-1963)
 100 Constitution Plaza (Charles DuBose, 1961)
 200 Constitution Plaza (Charles DuBose 1963)
 250 Constitution Plaza (Charles DuBose, 1962-1963)
 Phoenix Life Insurance Company Building (Harrison & Abramovitz, 1962-1964)

Of particular note is the blue-green glass, two-sided Phoenix Life Insurance Company Building.  Referred to locally as "the boat building", especially when viewed at its two bowed "corners", it is the largest and last of the plaza's original tenants and is regarded as the signature building of Constitution Plaza, and considered one of Connecticut's finest modern architectural treasures.  
For many years, its claim to trivia has been that it is the only "two-sided building" in the world. In addition to that, the Connecticut Science Center & Conference Center is adjacent to Constitution Plaza with Adrien's landing and walkway to East Hartford, Connecticut.

A significant loss was the demolition of the landmark 'Broadcast House' building which sat the SE corner of the Plaza at State and Commerce Street, and was the first building completed at Constitution Plaza in 1961.  
Vacated in 2007 and demolished in 2009, it was the long-time home of local CBS affiliate station, WFSB-TV who moved to a new building in the suburb of Rocky Hill in mid-2007.
'Broadcast House' was originally constructed for the Travelers Insurance Company's own WTIC-AMFM]]-TV3) until they sold their broadcasting division to different owners in March 1974. 
The four story, square structure sat partially below plaza level and was noted for its cantilevered, waffle-like roof parapet. 
It also featured a roof garden in the center of the forth level which was for its executive offices.  
The Broadcast House site has been vacant for over 13 years.  

A freestanding pavilion structure on the plaza level was programmed to be a restaurant, but was used as office space for most of its history. This quirk was due to city fire codes that did not allow for issuance of an occupancy permit, since the structure did not exit directly onto an actual street.  The building later housed a television studio for The Gayle King Show, a popular Italian restaurant, television studios for a fledging golf network, and is currently part of the downtown Hartford campus of Trinity College.  

Other structures include a U-shaped (former) retail court at its northern end, which was altered in the mid 1980s' with a new five-level office complex 'piggybacked' on its eastern side that once housed Travelers Insurance Company's Training Center, which is now vacant.  At first, it contained such upmarket specialty stores as Brentano's bookstore, Peck & Peck, and a branch of W & J Sloane furniture.  Also built was a 12-story, 300-room hotel that originally opened as Hotel America in April 1964.  The hotel was later operated for almost twenty years as an upscale Sonesta Hotel property, then finally as a Clarion hotel before closing in the mid-1990s. The property was then owned by an investment group tied to religious order, several recent renovation attempts have been thwarted, due in large part to the high asking sale price for the property. After sitting empty for nearly a decade, the building reopened as luxury apartments known as Spectra in 2015.  

Tying all these buildings together are well-detailed, large pedestrian spaces and overstreet bridges that showcase stylish walkways and paved areas, planter beds with professionally maintained landscaping, large potted trees, a modernist clock tower, reflecting pools and fountains designed by landscape architect Masao Kinoshita.  The entire plaza area sits atop a 1,600-car, multi-level parking garage.

Viewed as a period design ensemble, it is a handsome if austere complex.  
A precursor to later megastructure and now more integrated mixed-use complexes, its construction was heralded as the future of urban design.  However, considering recent trends that emphasize more traditional streetscapes, this self-contained urban environment seems outdated.  It shares its design "brotherhood" of multiple-style buildings connected by large, above-grade pedestrian spaces with two similar but much larger renewal projects, Charles Center in downtown Baltimore, Maryland, and the Prudential Center (Boston) complex in Boston, Massachusetts, although these two developments have been significantly altered (The Prudential Center was mostly converted to an enclosed mall in the early 1990s) and have also experienced varying degrees of economic and planning success.

Often viewed as a classic example of the fallibility of urban renewal, Constitution Plaza was for many of its early years a well-celebrated aesthetic and economic success, as it stabilized the initial decline of the downtown business district, and in combination with the later XL Center complex, sparked a modest downtown revival and office building boom that began in the mid-1970s.  From the 1980's through the mid-2000's and through multiple ownerships, the mergers/demise and eventual vacating of most of the anchor corporate tenants, and Hartford, Connecticut/ Hartford's sharp economic decline which took hold in the early 1990s, it has called into question the Plaza's long-term viability without significant re-investment and maintenance.

Present State of Disrepair
Toured in the fall 2021, it appears that the many subsequent owners have allowed Constitution Plaza to suffer from deferred maintenance, with no cohesive long-term repair or landscape guidelines that respect and uphold the modernist elegance of its original design, with many of the Plaza's signature elements being neglected and poorly maintained.  

Many of the landscape beds that surround the large, round planters are devoid of any ground cover, and instead show just dirt and weeds, with the trees  becoming overgrown and poorly maintained.  The once elegant 'Willow Court' on the north side of the clock tower has lost several of the signature trees and the planter mounds are poorly maintained with non-complementary planting.
The one time 'Bell court' near the clock tower is particularly ignored, and has not been well-maintained in years, with stone and aggregate walls and the walkways ignored and left to crack and heave.  Lighting throughout the plaza is poorly maintained and inconsistent, with several 'traditional themed' light poles added that have no relationship to the original modernist theme.
A once grand stair from that connected the Willow Court to Market and Temple Streets was removed at some point, with a cheap railing placed along that edge.  Some sparsely placed moveable furniture has been set in that area, but appears forlorn and un-inviting.  The main fountain now features several dark brown oxidation marks where water cascades to the main pool and mars the elegance of the original granite color. 
Many of the walkways which were reset in a more traditional brick, and replaced the original poured aggregate that was original plaza level surface, is now cracked with the brick flaking from freeze/ thaw and poor maintenance.  While there on a rainy day...it also appears the entire plaza needs the drainage system unclogged, with many shallow pools of standing water along stretches of the Plaza walkways. 
Many steps on the original grand staircases to the plaza level from Market Street are now heaving and out of alignment, showing significant joint displacement.  The garden court that once tied-in the now demolished Broadcast House is particularly sad and is little used with an adjacent vacant lot...right at one of Hartford's 'front doors' to the city center. 
The parking garages are in need of waterproofing, new lighting and updated paint.  The entire plaza also features an updated 'logo/ brand' signage, but it's inconsistently applied and poorly maintained.

Events at the plaza
Constitution Plaza was the site of many annual public events, such as the popular Festival of Lights during the holiday season (which has since been relocated in a scaled-down form to nearby Bushnell Park), and a number of concerts and sing-alongs. In its earlier years, it hosted several outdoor Easter Sunday services and the Taste of Hartford food festival.

References

 Emporis entry
 Connecticut History
 Hartford Courant article, "Hartford's Constitution Plaza: Potential Still Unfolding", September 25, 2013
 The Cultural Landscape Foundation
 Sasaki blog entry

External links

 Omaxfield.com
 dbarch.com
 Taste of Hartford

Buildings and structures in Hartford, Connecticut
Economy of Hartford, Connecticut
Tourist attractions in Hartford, Connecticut